Pyganodon gibbosa is a species of freshwater mussel, an aquatic bivalve mollusk in the family Unionidae, the river mussels.

This species is endemic to the Altamaha River basin in Georgia of the United States.

References

gibbosa
Molluscs of the United States
Bivalves described in 1824
Taxonomy articles created by Polbot